Gano Chittenden (1897–1980) was an American art director.

Selected filmography
 Call of the South Seas (1944)
 Marshal of Reno (1944)
 Secrets of Scotland Yard (1944)
 Stagecoach to Monterey (1944)
 The Girl Who Dared (1944)
 Storm Over Lisbon (1944)
 Grissly's Millions (1945)
 Girls of the Big House (1945)
 Utah (1945)
 Flame of the Barbary Coast (1945)
 The Chicago Kid (1945)
 Sioux City Sue (1946)
 The Catman of Paris (1946)
 Apache Rose (1947)
 Bells of San Angelo (1947)
 Strike It Rich (1948)

References

Bibliography
 Darby, William. Anthony Mann: The Film Career. McFarland, 2009.

External links

1897 births
1980 deaths
American art directors
Artists from New York City